Daniel Desnoyers, also known by his stage name Dan D-Noy, is a Canadian DJ and owner of D-Noy Muzik. Desnoyers is the official Canada DJ for the Pacha clubs. He is best known for his song "Good World", which was a hit in Europe. Among his other original compositions, "I Said" made it to the top 10 of the Canadian Dance Chart, "Moon Sharm" in the top 40 and "4 Ladies" obtained success in the clubs of Canada.

Biography
Dan Desnoyers worked as a VJ and also as a manager of DanseXpress with the TV channel MusiquePlus from 1993 to 2002. The six albums from the series DanseXpress were also created around that time. From 2001 to 2006, he was the official DJ of the Galas Interbox at the Bell Centre in Montreal.

Producer, director, sound engineer, mixer, remixer and CD conceptor, Daniel Desnoyers eventually started in June 1999 his own music label, DKD D-Noy Muzik, within the Donald K. Donald Group. In 2003, DKD D-Noy Muzik became D-Noy Muzik and since that time Dan Desnoyers is the sole owner.

In June 2000, Daniel Desnoyers created the compilation Touchdown 2000 for the cheerleaders of the Alouettes de Montréal. He is also the creator of the series Spin (Vol. 1 to 6). At the beginning of 2000, he was co-host and DJ on the radio show Le Beat on Énergie who was broadcast on the whole network every Friday evenings, which counted 1 700 000 listeners. This show engendered the compilations Le Beat, Vol. 1 to 6.

On June 15, 2004, he published Tandem a double CD with thirty house titles mixed by himself and French DJ Antoine Clamaran. On July 17, 2004, Daniel Desnoyers packed up his turntables and moved from Énergie to Montreal's CKOI 96,9 for a new radio show called Spin. The compilations Power Spin, Vol. 1 to 3, were released at the same time. In 2005, Daniel Desnoyers began a new series Le Nightclub with vocal house flavour.

In August 2006, Daniel Desnoyers returned to work for Énergie on the radio shows Le Party 5 @ 8 and Pure Dan Desnoyers. In these shows, Dan Desnoyers played the hottest new tracks and special requests from the listeners. Two new series of compilations, In Da House and Club Sound, were released. Dan left the radio in August 2010.

After a passage in Pacha Club Ibiza in Spain, Pacha Records Label and D-Noy Muzik joined to create the compilation, Live at Pacha Club Ibiza (2007). Four more compilations of the same style were created after his performances at Pacha Club Egypt, Live at Pacha Club Egypt – Sharm El Sheikh (2008), at Pacha Club Brazil, Live at Pacha Club Brazil – Sao Paulo (2009), at Pacha Club Moscow, Live at Pacha Club Moscow (2010) and Pacha Ibiza (2014).

In May 2014, Dan D-Noy signed with Ultra Records and mixed the Ultra Mix 6 compilation for the label.

After a stint at Pacha Club Ibiza in Spain, Pacha Records Label and D-Noy Muzik team up to create the compilation Live at Pacha Club Ibiza (2007). Three other compilations of the same genre were created following his performances at Pacha Club Egypt, Live at Pacha Club Egypt Sharm El Sheikh (2008), at Pacha Club Brazil, Live at Pacha Club Brazil São Paulo (2009), at Pacha Club Moscow, Live at Pacha Club Moscow (2010) and Pacha Ibiza (2014).

In 2018, Dan D-Noy celebrates 30 years of career! His desire to introduce the Quebec and Canadian public to new musical trends is far from running out of steam and the famous DJ is preparing several collaborations for the coming months. His piece There with you (Feat. Margau & Garrett Raff) V.F is already one of the radio hits of summer 2018. A remix version by Kalvaro has also been available since June.

His song ''Prêt à tout'' with Adamo and Doug St-Louis becomes the official song of the Telus TV campaign for the summer 2021 season and in the same period Dan D-Noy signs the soundtrack of the TV campaign Vincent d' Amerique with the participation of Georges St-Pierre.

To date, Dan D-Noy has sold more than a million copies of his compilations: DanseXpress, Spin, Le Beat, Power Spin, Le Nightclub, In Da House, Club Sound, Pacha, Summer Session and Winter Session. Dan also continues to make performances in various clubs of Quebec, Canada, Europe and the United States.

Compositions

Remixes

See also
D-Noy Muzik

References

External links
Official website

Living people
Remixers
Canadian DJs
Canadian radio personalities
Canadian house musicians
Canadian record producers
Musicians from Montreal
Ultra Records artists
Electronic dance music DJs
Year of birth missing (living people)